The Belt & Road Industrial and Commercial Alliance (BRICA) was launched in June 2016. It is an international non-governmental organization which forms a collegium of national business associations from Europe and Asia, especially China. The Chinese envision this alliance as a promoter of industrial investment and economic and trade co-operation for countries along the Silk Road and 21st Century Maritime Silk Road. The BRICA has at least "25 industrial and commercial organizations from 23 countries of Asia, Europe, Middle East, Africa and Latin America".

References

Trade associations based in China
Belt and Road Initiative
People's Republic of China friendship associations
Organizations established in 2016
2016 establishments in China